Vikaičiai is a village in Kėdainiai district municipality, in Kaunas County, in central Lithuania. According to the 2011 census, the village had a population of 305 people. It is located 5 km from Gudžiūnai, by the Nykis and Druskalnis rivers. There are a library and a former school building.

During the Soviet era Vikaičiai was "Žemaitė" kolkhoz center.

Demography

References

Villages in Kaunas County
Kėdainiai District Municipality